Ralph Kilmann is an American management consultant, educator, and author. He co-authored the Thomas–Kilmann Conflict Mode Instrument, a framework for understanding conflict based on five 'modes' of conflict responses: competing, accommodating, avoiding, collaborating, and compromising.

Bibliography 

 Ralph H. Kilmann with Louis R. Pondy and Dennis P. Slevin (Eds.), The Management of Organizational Design: Volume I, Strategy and Implementation, North-Holland, New York, 1976.
 Ralph H. Kilmann with Louis R. Pondy and Dennis P. Slevin (Eds.), The Management of Organizational Design: Volume II, Research and Methodology, North-Holland, New York, 1976.
 Ralph H. Kilmann, Social Systems Design: Normative Theory and the MAPS Design Technology, North-Holland, New York, 1977.
 Ralph H. Kilmann and Ian I. Mitroff, Methodological Approaches to Social Science: Integrating Divergent Concepts and Theories, Jossey-Bass, San Francisco, 1978.
 Ralph H. Kilmann with Kenneth W. Thomas, Dannis P. Slevin, Raghu Nath, and S. Lee Jerrell (Eds.), Producing Useful Knowledge for Organizations, Praeger, New York, 1983.
 Ralph H. Kilmann, Beyond the Quick Fix: Managing Five Tracks to Organizational Success, Jossey-Bass, San Francisco, 1984.
 Ralph H. Kilmann with Ian I. Mitroff, Corporate Tragedies: Product Tampering, Sabotage, and Other Catastrophes, Praeger, New York, 1984.
 Ralph H. Kilmann with Mary J. Saxton, Roy Serpa, and Associates, Gaining Control of the Corporate Culture, Jossey-Bass, San Francisco, 1985.
 Ralph H. Kilmann with Teresa Joyce Covin and Associates, Corporate Transformation: Revitalizing Organizations for a Competitive World, Jossey-Bass, San Francisco, 1988.
 Ralph H. Kilmann, Managing Beyond the Quick Fix: A Completely Integrated Program for Creating and Maintaining Organizational Success, Jossey-Bass, San Francisco, 1989.
 Ralph H. Kilmann, Escaping the Quick Fix Trap: How to Make Organizational Improvements That Really Last, Audiobook, Jossey-Bass, San Francisco, 1989.
 Ralph H. Kilmann with Associates, Making Organizations Competitive: Enhancing Networks and Relationships Across Traditional Boundaries, Jossey-Bass, San Francisco, 1991.
 Ralph H. Kilmann, Workbook for Implementing the Tracks: Volume I, II, and III, Kilmann Diagnostics, Newport Coast, CA, 1991.
 Ralph H. Kilmann, Logistics Manual for Implementing the Tracks: Planning and Organizing Workshop Sessions, Kilmann Diagnostics, Newport Coast, CA, 1991.
 Ralph H. Kilmann with Associates, Managing Ego Energy: The Transformation of Personal Meaning into Organizational Success, Jossey-Bass, San Francisco, 1994.
 Ralph H. Kilmann, Quantum Organizations: A New Paradigm for Achieving Organizational Success and Personal Meaning, Davies-Black, Palo Alto, CA, 2001.
 Ralph H. Kilmann, The Courageous Mosaic: Awakening Society, Systems and Souls, Kilmann Diagnostics, Newport Coast, CA, 2013.
 Ralph H. Kilmann with Ian I. Mitroff, The Psychodynamics of Enlightened Leadership: Coping with Chaos, Springer, New York, 2021.
 Ralph H. Kilmann, Creating a Quantum Organization: The Whys & Hows of Implementing Eight Tracks for Long-Term Success, Kilmann Diagnostics, Newport Coast, CA, 2021.

References 

Living people
Management consultants
American writers
University of California, Los Angeles alumni
Year of birth missing (living people)